This is a list of counties of Kenya by GDP and GDP per capita.  The GDP of all counties together is lower than the total GDP of the country because it does not include taxes less subsidies on products.

List of counties by GDP 
Counties by GDP in 2022 according to data by the Kenya National Bureau of Statistics.

List of counties by GDP per capita 
Counties by GDP per capita in 2017 according to data by the Kenya National Bureau of Statistics.

See also 
Economy of Kenya

References 

Kenya
GDP
Kenya